American Prodigal is the second studio album by Crowder released on September 23, 2016.

It was released in partnership with Sparrow Records and sixstepsrecords, imprints of Capitol Christian Music Group.

Awards and accolades 
On August 9, 2017, it was announced that American Prodigal would be nominated for a GMA Dove Award in the Rock/Contemporary Album of the Year and the Recorded Music Packaging of the Year categories at the 48th Annual GMA Dove Awards.

Track listing

Chart performance

Album

References

2016 albums
Sparrow Records albums
Crowder (musician) albums